Roque is a given name.  It is the Spanish version of Rocco. Notable persons with that name include:
 Roque (footballer) (born 1973), Brazilian football player
 Roque Alfaro (born 1956), Argentine football player and manager
 Roque Antonio Adames Rodríguez (1928–2009), Dominican Republic Roman Catholic bishop
 Roque Avallay (born 1945), Argentine football player
 Roque Balduque (died 1561), Spanish sculptor and maker of altarpieces
 Roque Cordero (1917–2008), Panamanian-American composer
 Roque Dalton (1935–1975), Salvadoran poet
 Roque de la Cruz (1580–1644), Irish Dominican prelate and Tridentine reformist
 Roque De La Fuente Guerra (born 1954), American businessman and 2016 presidential candidate  
 Roque Esteban Scarpa (1914-1995), Chilean writer, literary critic and scholar
 Roque Estrada Reynoso (born 1883), Mexican lawyer, journalist and writer
 Roque Fernández (born 1947), Argentine economist and politician
 Roque Funes (1897-1981), Argentine cinematographer
 Roque González Garza (1885-1962), Mexican general and politician
 Roque Júnior (born 1976), Brazilian football player
 Roque Máspoli (1917-2004), Uruguayan football player and coach
 Roque Olsen (1925-1992), Argentine football player and manager
 Roque Pinto, Indian doctor
 Roque Ponce (late 17th century), Spanish painter
 Roque Ruaño (1877–1935), Spanish priest-civil engineer
 Roque Sáenz Peña (1851–1914), Argentine politician
 Roque Santa Cruz (born 1981), Paraguayan football player
 Dom Roque Tello de Menezes, Portuguese nobleman
 Roque Vallejos (1943-2006), Paraguayan poet, psychiatrist and essayist
 Roque "Rocky" Versace, (1937–1965), American soldier

See also
 Roque (disambiguation)

Masculine given names